This is a list of notable Teochews.

Entrepreneurs

 Mainland China
 Huang Guangyu (黄光裕; Ng Guangyu; Wong Kwong Yu) (1969–; Chaoyang, Guangdong), founder and chairman of GOME Group; formerly the richest person in mainland China
 Ma Huateng (馬化騰/马化腾; Bhê Huejam) (1971–; Chaoyang, Guangdong), One of the top ten richest man in the world, with estimated net worth of US$55.3 billion. He is the founder, chairman and CEO of Tencent, Asia most valuable company by market capitalisation.Tencent is one of the largest Internet and technology companies, and the biggest investment, gaming and entertainment conglomerates in the world.
 Lin Shouzhi (1873–1924), rubber merchant and supporter of Sun Yat-sen
 Hong Kong
Charles Heung(1948-; Chaozhou, Guangdong; born in Hong Kong) Hong Kong actor-turned-film producer and presenter. Founder of China Star Entertainment Group
 Li Ka-shing (李嘉誠/李嘉诚; Li Jiacheng; Lee Ka Sing) (1928–; Chaozhou, Guangdong), founder and chairman of Cheung Kong Group; formerly the 8th richest person in the world and formerly the richest person of Chinese and Chinese descent in the world. As of June 2019, he is the 30th richest person in the world, with a current net worth of US$29.4 billion
 Lim Por-yen (林百欣; Lin Baixin; Lim Bêhyan) (1914–2005; Chaoyang, Guangdong), founder of Lai Sun Group, media tycoon, banker and charitarian
 Albert Yeung (楊受成/杨受成; Yang Shoucheng; Yêng Siuseng) (1944–; Chaozhou, Guangdong; born in Hong Kong), founder and chairman of Emperor Group
 Joseph Lau (劉鑾雄/刘銮雄; Liu Luanxong; Liu Luanghiong) (1951–; Chaozhou, Guangdong), founder, chairman and CEO of Chinese Estates Group
 Vincent Lo (羅康瑞/罗康瑞; Luo Kangri; Lo Kang Sui) (1948–; Puning, Guangdong), founder and chairman of Shui On Group
Chau Chak Wing
 Thailand
 Low Kiok Chiang (1843–1911; born in Swatow, Guangdong), founder of Khiam Hoa Heng entreprises (1872–1950s)
 Chin Sophonpanich (Thai: ชิน โสภณพนิช; Chinese: 陳弼臣) (1909–1988; Chaoyang, Guangdong; born in Thailand), founder of Bangkok Bank
 Dhanin Chearavanont (Thai: ธนินท์ เจียรวนนท์; 謝國民/谢国民; Xie Guomin; Zia Gokmi) (1939–; Chenghai, Guangdong), CEO of Charoen Pokphand Group (Chia Tai Group)
 Prachai Leophai-ratana (Thai: ประชัย เลี่ยวไพรัตน; 廖漢渲/廖汉渲; Liao Hanxuan; Liu Hangsuang) (Chao'an, Guangdong), founder and former CEO of Thai Petrochemical Industry (TPI) and TPI Polene
 Chatri Sophonpanich (Thai: ชาตรี โสภณพนิช; 陳有漢/陈有汉; Chen Youhan; Tan U-hang) (1934–2018; Chaoyang, Guangdong), CEO of Bangkok Bank
 Krit Ratanarak (Thai: กฤตย์ รัตนรักษ์;李智正; Li Zhizheng; Li Dizian) (–; Chenghai, Guangdong), CEO of Siam City Cement Public Company Limited and Bank of Ayudhya Public Company Limited
 Singapore
 Lim Nee Soon (林義順/林义顺; Lin Yishun) (1879–1936; Shantou, Guangdong), Chinese Peranakan banker and businessman, rubber magnate and was nicknamed the "Pineapple King", founding member of Teochew Poit Ip Huay Kuan and close friend of Dr Sun Yat Sen.
 Lien Ying Chow (連瀛洲/连瀛洲; Lian Yingzhou; Lian Yingzio) (1906–2004; Chaoyang, Guangdong), founder and CEO of Overseas Union Bank which merged with United Overseas Bank in 2001
 Tang Choon Keng (董俊競/董俊竞; Dong Junjing; Dang Junggeng) (1901–2000; Shantou, Guangdong), founder of Tangs
 Leow Chia Heng (廖正興/廖正兴; Liao Zhengxing) (1874–1931; Chao'an, Guangdong), Teochew pioneer and philanthropist; co-founder of the Sze Hai Tong Banking & Insurance Company Limited and the Singapore Chinese Chamber of Commerce, having served as the latter's 6th and 9th President in 1911 and 1914 respectively; was a Director of the Singapore Po Leung Kuk and appointed as Justice of the Peace; inaugural President of the Straits Confucian Association (later renamed as Nanyang Confucian Association)
 Malaysia
 Tan Sri William Cheng (鐘廷森/钟廷森; Zhong Tingsen; Tong Tingsiam) (Chaoyang, Guangdong), chairman of Lion Group and Parkson Retail Group
 United States
 David Tran (陳德/陈德; Chen De, Trần Họ) (Chaozhou, Guangdong), founder of Huy Fong Foods which is famous for the Sriracha sauce
 Ted Ngoy (Shantou, Guangdong), owner of Christy's Donuts and known as the "Donut King"
France
Tang Brothers, founder of Tang Frères in France

Film directors
 Mainland China
 Zheng Zhengqiu (鄭正秋/郑正秋; Dên Zianciu) (1888–1935; Chaoyang, Guangdong), director; his film Nan Fu Nan Qi (難夫難妻/难夫难妻; Nang Hu Nang Ci) was the first feature film in China's history
 Cai Chusheng (蔡楚生; Cua Cosên) (1906–1968; Chaoyang, Guangdong), director; his film Yu Guang Qu (漁光曲/渔光曲; Heu Guang Kêg) received the first international film prize in China's history
 Hong Kong
 Ringo Lam (林嶺東/林岭东; Lin Lindong; Lim Lingdang) (1954–; Chaozhou, Guangdong), director
 Herman Yau (邱禮濤/邱礼涛; Qiu Litao; Yau Loito) (1961–; Chaozhou, Guangdong), director
 Singapore
 Ken Kwek (1979-; director, his feature film "Unlucky Plaza" (2014) won him the Best Director prize at the Tehran Jasmine Film Festival.
 Kirsten Tan (1981-; director, her debut feature film "Pop Aye" won the Special Jury prize in Screenwriting in the Sundance Film Festival (2017)

Literary figures and the Arts
 Mainland China
 Da-Wen Sun (1962-Chaozhou, Guangdong), world authority in food engineering education and research
 Xu Dishan (1893–1941; Jieyang, Guangdong), philosopher
 Hong Zicheng (洪子誠/洪子诚; Hong Zeshin) (1939–; Chaozhou, Guangdong), scholar in the field of the history of literature
 Chen Pingyuan (陳平原/陈平原; Tan Pêngnguang) (1954–; Chaozhou, Guangdong), literary professor
Hong Kong
 Tchan Fou-li (1916- ), founder of Chinese Photographic Association of Hong Kong and internationally known photographer
 Zhao Tingyang (趙汀陽/赵汀阳; Dio Teng-iang) (1961–; Shantou, Guangdong), Chinese philosophy researcher
 Jao Tsung-I (饒宗頤/饶宗颐; Rao Zongyi; Dziau Zong-i) (1917–; Chaozhou, Guangdong), Chinese scholar, poet, calligrapher and painter
 Canada
 Vincent Lam, born in Canada, novelist
 United States
 Wena Poon (1974–), born in Singapore, novelist
 Cheryl Lu-Lien Tan (陳如蓮, 1974–), born in Singapore, novelist and memoirist
 Loung Ung (1970–), born in Cambodia, author and activist
 Singapore
 Choo Hoey (朱暉/朱晖, 1934 -) is a Singaporean musician and conductor. His father, Choo Seng, migrated from Chaozhou and his mother from Nanjing. He founded the Singapore Symphony Orchestra and was also its first resident conductor and music director
 Chen Chong Swee (b. 1910–85, Swatow, Guangdong), also known as Chen Kai, was a painter, educator, writer and critic. Chen belonged to the pioneering group of artists of the Nanyang Style
 Chua Lam (蔡瀾/蔡澜; Chai Lan; Cua Lam) (1941–; Chaozhou, Guangdong), columnist, food critic, and movie producer

 Australia

Alice Pung (方佳,1981–) Author and Novelist

Politicians
Cambodia
 Hun Sen, Prime Minister of Cambodia

United States
 Tammy Duckworth, American politician, former U.S. Army lieutenant colonel

Australia

 Gladys Liu, Australian Politician, a Liberal Party member of the Australian House of Representatives representing the Division of Chisholm in Victoria

Canada

 Alice Wong, Minister of State for Seniors; the first Chinese-Canadian woman sitting in Cabinet

 Singapore

 Seah Eu Chin, Founder of Ngee Ann Kongsi, was a made a Justice of the Peace and a member of the Grand Jury
 Tan Soo Khoon, former Speaker of the Parliament of Singapore
 Heng Swee Keat, Deputy Prime Minister and Finance Minister
 Lee Boon Yang, former Minister for Information, Communications and the Arts
 Teo Chee Hean, Senior Minister, Co-ordinating Minister of National Security
 Low Thia Khiang, former Secretary-General, Workers’ Party, former Member of Parliament, the de facto opposition leader between 2006 and 2018
 Lim Swee Say, Cabinet Minister in Prime Minister's Office
 Lim Boon Heng, former Cabinet Minister
 Baey Yam Keng, Member of Parliament, Tampines
 Seng Han Thong, former Member of Parliament, Yio Chu Kang
 George Yeo, former Minister for Foreign Affairs (Singapore)
 Teo Ser Luck, Senior Parliamentary Secretary for the Ministry of Community Development, Youth and Sports and Ministry of Transport
 Chiam See Tong, prominent Opposition Member of Parliament
 Lim Hwee Hua, first female minister of Singapore

Thailand

 Taksin the Great, Founder and only monarch of Thonburi kingdom
 Pridi Banomyong, 7th Prime Minister of Thailand
 Banharn Silpa-archa, 21st Prime Minister of Thailand
 Samak Sundaravej, 25th Prime Minister of Thailand
 Chamlong Srimuang, former Deputy Prime Minister and Governor of Bangkok

Malaysia

 Tan Kee Soon, first Kapitan China of Tebrau, Johor Bahru
 Tan Hiok Nee, Major China of Johor and member for the Council of State of Johor
 Chua Jui Meng, former Minister of Health
 Chua Soi Lek, former Minister of Health
 Chua Tee Yong(), Member of Parliament

Sportspeople
Mainland China
 Guo Weiyang (1988–; Shantou, Guangdong; born in Yuxi, Yunnan), gymnast, gold medalist at the 2012 Summer Olympics
 Liao Lisheng (1993–; Jiexi, Guangdong), footballer, Chinese international team player
 Lin Yue (1991–; Chaozhou, Guangdong), diver, gold medalist at the 2008 and 2016 Summer Olympics
 Sun Shuwei (1976–; Jieyang, Guangdong), diver, gold medalist at the 1992 Summer Olympics
 Zhang Yanquan (1994–; Chaozhou, Guangdong), diver, gold medalist at the 2012 Summer Olympics
United States
 Michael Chang (1972–; Chaozhou, Guangdong; born in the United States), former professional tennis player
Canada
Mervin Tran (1972–; Figure Skater
Singapore
Tan Howe Liang (1933–; Shantou, Guangdong), the first Singaporean Olympic individual silver medalist

Entertainers
Mainland China
 He Meitian (何美鈿/何美钿; He Meitian; Ho Muitiang) (1983–; Chaozhou, Guangdong), actress
 Chen Chusheng (陳楚生/陈楚生; Tan Cosên) (1981–; Puning, Guangdong; born in Sanya, Hainan), singer
 Chrissie Chau (1985–; Chaozhou, Guangdong), actress and model
 Tizzy T (謝銳韜/谢锐韬; 1993–; Chaoshan, Guangdong), rapper
 Danko (弹壳) (刘嘉裕/劉嘉裕; 1992–; Shantou, Guangdong), rapper
Hong Kong
 Canti Lau (劉錫明/劉锡明; Liu Ximing; Liu Siahmêng) (1964–; Chaoyang, Guangdong; born in Hong Kong), actor and singer
Damian Lau (劉松仁/刘松仁; Liu Songren; Lau Cungjan) (1949–; Chaozhou, Guangdong; born in Hong Kong), film and television actor, executive producer and film director
 Sammul Chan (陳鍵鋒/陈键锋; Chén Jiànfēng; Chan Gin-fung) (1978–; Chaozhou, Guangdong; born in Hong Kong), actor, singer
 Emil Chau (周華健/周华健; Zhou Huajian; Chiu Hua-giang) (1960–; Chaoyang, Guangdong; born in Hong Kong), actor and singer
 Matthew Ko (高鈞賢/高钧贤; Gao Junxian; Gao Jao-ghao) (1984–; Chaozhou, Guangdong; born in Hong Kong), model
 Kwong Wa (江華/江华; Jiang Hua; Gang Hua) (1962–; Shantou, Guangdong; born in Hong Kong), actor and singer
 Miriam Yeung (楊千嬅/杨千桦; Yang Qianhua; Yêng Cainhua) (1974–; Jieyang, Guangdong; born in Hong Kong), actress and singer
 Sammi Cheng (鄭秀文/郑秀文; Zheng Xiuwen; Dên Siu-mung) (1972–; Chenghai, Guangdong; born in Hong Kong), actress and singer
 Ada Choi (蔡少芬/蔡少芬; Cai Shaofen; Choi Siufun) (1973–; Chaoshan, Guangdong; born in Hong Kong), actress
 Steven Ma (馬浚偉/马浚伟; Ma FengWei; Maa Zeonwai) (1971–; Chaozhou, Guangdong; born in Hong Kong), actor and singer
 Stephen Wong Cheung-Hing  (1978–; Shantou, Guangdong; born in Hong Kong), actor
 Karena Lam  (1978–; Chaozhou, Guangdong; born in Canada), actress and singer
 Eric Suen Yiu Wai  (1973–; Chaozhou, Guangdong; born in Hong Kong), actor, singer and TV host
 Joe Ma  (1968–;Chaozhou, Guangdong; born in Hong Kong), actor
 Kent Tong  (1958–; Chaozhou, Guangdong; born in Hong Kong), actor, screenwriter and film producer
 Kent Cheng  (1951–; Shantou, Guangdong; born in Hong Kong), TV and film actor
 Bosco Wong  (1980–; Chaozhou, Guangdong; born in Hong Kong), actor
 Lucas Wong (1999–; born in Hong Kong), rapper, singer, and model

Singapore
 Zoe Tay (Zhèng Huìyù; Jeng Wai Yuk) (1968–; Chaozhou, Guangdong; born in Singapore), actress
 Chen Shucheng (1949–;Chaoshan, Chaozhou; born in Singapore, actor
 Chen Liping (1965–;Chaozhou, Guangdong; born in Singapore, actress
 Huang Wenyong, actor
 Li Nanxing (1964-; Chaozhou, Guangdong; born in Malaysia), actor 
 Celest Chong() (1973–; Chaozhou, Guangdong; born in Singapore), singer and actress
 Stefanie Sun (孫燕姿/孙燕姿; Sun Yanzi; Sung Ince) (1978–; Chaozhou, Guangdong; born in Singapore), singer
 Kym Ng (1967-; Chaozhou, Guangdong; born in Singapore), actress and TV host
 Dennis Chew (1973-; Chaozhou, Guangdong; born in Singapore), radio deejay, variety show host, actor and singer
 Chew Chor Meng (1968-; Chaozhou, Guangdong; born in Singapore), actor 
 Pornsak Prajakwit (1984-; Chaozhou, Guangdong; born in Thailand), variety show host
 Christopher Lee Meng Soon (1971-; Chaozhou, Guangdong; born in Malaysia), actor, host, singer
 Xiang Yun (1961-; Chaozhou, Guangdong; born in Singapore), actress and TV host
 Chen Hanwei (1969-; Chaozhou, Guangdong; born in Malaysia), actor and singer
 Tan Kheng Hua (1963-; Chaozhou, born in Singapore), actress
South Korea
 Jang Yong (Korean: 張龍/장용; 張龍/张龙; Zhang Long; Dion Leng) (1945–; Chaozhou, Guangdong; born in South Korea), actor

United Kingdom
 Jessica Henwick (1992–; born in Surrey), actress

United States
 Amber Liu (singer) (1992–; born in Los Angeles), singer, rapper and songwriter

Canada
 Henry Lau (1989–; born in Toronto), singer, songwriter, composer, dancer, actor, musician, model and entertainer

Others
 Somdet Phrachao Taksin Maharaj (Thai: สมเด็จพระเจ้าตากสินมหาราช) or Somdet Phrachao Krung Thonburi (Thai: สมเด็จพระเจ้ากรุงธนบุรี; Chinese: 鄭昭; pinyin: Zhèng Zhāo; Teochew: Dênchao) (1734–1782; Chenghai, Shantou; born in Thailand), King Taksin the Great of Thonburi Kingdom, Thailand
 Chow Yam-nam (周欽南) (1937-2013), famous spiritual guru born in Pattaya of Thailand, better known publicly as Bai Long Wang (白龍王), literally the "White Dragon King". 
 Limahong (林鳳/林凤; Lin Feng; Lim Hong) (15??–15??; Raoping, Chaozhou, Guangdong), pirate, tried and failed to capture Manila from the Spanish Philippines
 Lê Văn Viễn (aka Bảy Viễn; Vien the seventh) (1904–1972; Chaozhou, Guangdong; born in Vietnam), leader of a powerful Vietnamese criminal organisation—Bình Xuyên Organisation
 Haing S. Ngor (1940–96; born in Samrong Yong, Cambodia), award-winning actor of Khmer and partial Chinese Teochew descent

See also
List of Hokkien people
List of Cantonese people

References